Antiplanes sanctiioannis is a species of sea snail, a marine gastropod mollusk in the family Pseudomelatomidae, the turrids.

Description
The length of the shell varies between 20 mm and 40 mm; maximum diameter 14 mm.

The fusiform shell contains 10 slightly convex whorls. The shell is clothed with a smooth, thickish, olive epidermis. The shell is covered with very narrow spiral striae and incremental flexuous stripes. The dark reddish aperture is ovate and contracted below. It measures about 2/5 of the total length. The siphonal canal is broad and slightly oblique. The narrow outer lip has a wide sinuation above the middle. The columella is twisted. The operculum is unguiform.

Distribution
This marine species occurs off he Pacific coast of northern Honshu, Japan; also in the Bering Sea.

References

 Aurivillius, Carl Wilhelm Samuel. Öfversigt öfver de af Vega-Expeditionen insamlade Arktiska hafsmollusker: Placophora och Gastropoda. Vega-Expeditionens vetenskapliga iakttagelser, 1885.
 
 Hasegawa K. (2009) Upper bathyal gastropods of the Pacific coast of northern Honshu, Japan, chiefly collected by R/V Wakataka-maru. In: T. Fujita (ed.), Deep-sea fauna and pollutants off Pacific coast of northern Japan. National Museum of Nature and Science Monographs 39: 225–383.

External links
 Specimen at MNHN, Paris
 

sanctiioannis
Gastropods described in 1875